Courbois is a surname. Notable people with the surname include:

 Kitty Courbois (born 1937), Dutch actress
 Philippe Courbois (active 1710–28), French Baroque composer
 Pierre Courbois (born 1940), Dutch jazz-drummer, bandleader, and composer

See also
 Courtois (disambiguation)